Russia competed at the 2019 European Games, in Minsk, Belarus from 21 to 30 June 2019. Russia had previously competed at the 2015 European Games in Baku, Azerbaijan, where it won 164 medals, including 79 golds. A total of 218 sportsmen competed in 15 sports.

Medalists

|width="30%" align=left valign=top|

Competitors

Archery

Recurve

Compound

Athletics

Track events

Field events

Team event

Badminton

Basketball 3x3

Team roster

Men
Ilia Karpenkov
Kirill Pisklov
Stanislav Sharov
Alexey Zherdev

Women
Yulia Kozik
Ekaterina Polyashova
Anna Pozdnyakova
Anastasiia Shuvagina

Summary

Beach soccer

Team roster
Maksim Chuzhkov
Yuri Krasheninnikov
Nikolai Kryshanov
Viktor Kryshanov
Aleksey Makarov
Ivan Ostrovskii
Artur Paporotnyi
Vladimir Raskin
Kirill Romanov
Dmitry Shishin
Anton Shkarin
Fedor Zemskov

Summary

Boxing

Men

Women

Canoe sprint

Men

Women

Cycling

Road
Men

Women

Track
Sprint

Team sprint

Team pursuit

Keirin

Omnium

Madison

Time trial

Individual pursuit

Endurance

Gymnastics

Acrobatic
Mixed

Aerobic
Mixed

Artistic
Men

Women

Rhythmic
Individual

Group

Trampoline

Judo

Men

Women

Mixed team

Karate

Kumite
Men

Sambo

Key:
 ML – Minimal advantage by last technical evaluation
 MT – Minimal advantage by technical points
 VH – Total victory – painful hold
 VO – Victory by technical points – the loser without technical points
 VP – Victory by technical points – the loser with technical points
 VS – Total victory by decisive superiority
 VT – Total victory – total throw

Men

Women

Shooting

Men

Women

Mixed team

Table tennis

Wrestling

Key:
 VFA – Victory by fall
 VFO – Victory by forfeit
 VIN – Victory by injury
 VPO – Victory by points – the loser without technical points
 VPO1 – Victory by points – the loser with technical points
 VSU – Victory by technical superiority – the loser without technical points and a margin of victory of at least 8 (Greco-Roman) or 10 (freestyle) points
 VSU1 – Victory by technical superiority – the loser with technical points and a margin of victory of at least 8 (Greco-Roman) or 10 (freestyle) points

Men's freestyle

Men's Greco-Roman

Women's freestyle

References

Nations at the 2019 European Games
European Games
2019